John Frederick Flowers (born 14 January 1954), an Australian politician, was a member of the New South Wales Legislative Assembly representing Rockdale for the Liberal Party from 2011 to 2015.

Early years and background
Flowers was a teacher at Belmore Boys' High School for over 20 years. He served as a Councillor on Kogarah Council between 1999 until 2004, and then Rockdale Council since 2004, where he served as Deputy Mayor and then Mayor.

Political career
In 2011, Flowers contested the normally safe Labor seat of Rockdale in the St George-Kogarah district. He was elected with 53.6 per cent of the two-party vote. Flowers' main opponent was Steve Kamper, representing Labor. Frank Sartor who was the previous Labor sitting member had earlier announced his retirement from politics after holding the seat for 8 years.

References

 

Liberal Party of Australia members of the Parliament of New South Wales
Members of the New South Wales Legislative Assembly
1954 births
Living people
21st-century Australian politicians
Mayors of Rockdale